Bhutanese red rice is a medium-grain rice grown in the Kingdom of Bhutan in the eastern Himalayas. It is the staple rice of the Bhutanese people. 

Bhutanese red rice is a red japonica rice. It is semi-milled—some of the reddish bran is left on the rice. Because of this, it cooks somewhat faster than an unmilled brown rice. When cooked, the rice is pale pink, soft and slightly sticky. 

This rice became available in the United States in the mid-1990s when Lotus Foods began importing it, and it is currently the only agricultural product imported from Bhutan.

See also
 Red rice

References 
 

Red rice
Japonica rice